James M'William Tennent (7 September 1888 – 20 March 1955) was a Scottish international rugby and cricket player.

His most successful match in his international career was against  at Inverleith on 22 January 1910, in which he scored three tries. He also played for West of Scotland RFC.

Tennent also played for the Scotland national cricket team.

References

Sources
 Bath, Richard (ed.) The Scotland Rugby Miscellany (Vision Sports Publishing Ltd, 2007 )
 Massie, Allan A Portrait of Scottish Rugby (Polygon, Edinburgh)

See also
 List of Scottish cricket and rugby union players

1888 births
1955 deaths
Cricketers from Glasgow
Rugby union players from Glasgow
Scotland international rugby union players
Scottish cricketers
Scottish rugby union players